Pingla Assembly constituency is an assembly constituency in Paschim Medinipur district in the Indian state of West Bengal.

Overview
As per orders of the Delimitation Commission, No. 227 Pingla Assembly constituency is composed of the following: Dhaneswarpur, Gobordhanpur, Jamna, Karkai, Kshirai, Kusumda and Pindurui gram panchayats of Pingla community development block and Kharagpur II community development block.

Pingla Assembly constituency is part of No. 32 Ghatal (Lok Sabha constituency). It was earlier part of Panskura (Lok Sabha constituency).

Election results

2021

2016

  

.# Swing calculated on Congress+Trinamool Congress vote percentages taken together in 2006.

2011

  

.# Swing calculated on Congress+Trinamool Congress vote percentages taken together in 2006.

1977-2006
In the 2006 state assembly elections, Ramapada Samanta of DSP(PC) won the Pingla assembly seat defeating Hrishikesh Dinda of Trinamool Congress. Contests in most years were multi cornered but only winners and runners are being mentioned. Rampada Samanta, Independent, defeated Raj Kumar Das of Trinamool Congress in 2001. Ramapada Samanta contesting on the CPI(M) symbol defeated Swapan Dome of Congress in 1996. Haripada Jana representing DSP(PC) defeated Saktipada Mahapatra of Congress in 1991, contesting as an independent defeated Sukumar Das of Congress in 1987 and 1982, and representing Janata Party defeated Bijoy Das of Congress in 1977.

1967-1972
Bijoy Das of Congress won in 1972 and 1971. Gouranga Samanta of CPI won in 1969 and 1967.

References

Assembly constituencies of West Bengal
Politics of Paschim Medinipur district